This is a list of Super Hero Squad toys. Super Hero Squad is a line of Marvel action figures designed for younger children, and a number of related products, including an animated TV series.

Marvel Super Hero Squad Two-Packs

Wave 1
 Angel (red costume) and Colossus
 Wolverine (no sleeves) and Sabretooth
 Cyclops (blue costume) and Magneto (silver base)
 Hawkeye and Captain America (shield in hand)

Wave 2
 Punisher (classic costume) and Ghost Rider
 Daredevil (arms to sides/red costume) and Elektra
 Iron Man (red and yellow armor) and Thor (blue armor)
 Hulk (green/purple pants) and Wasp

Wave 3
 Mister Fantastic and Super Skrull
 Invisible Woman and Doctor Doom
 Thing (pants/black shoes) and Namor
 Human Torch (opaque body) and Silver Surfer

Wave 4
 Phoenix and Wolverine (version 2, brown costume)
 Nightcrawler and Juggernaut
 Beast and Iceman
 Mole Man and Thing (shorts)

Wave 5
 Johnny Storm (version 2) and Annihilus
 Ultimate Nick Fury and Ultimate Captain America
 Storm and Black Panther
 Logan with motorcycle
 Bobby Drake and Pyro
 Ant-Man and Doctor Strange
 Thor (The Reigning) and Loki
 Gambit and Rogue

 Wave 5 was released as two waves (Wave 5 and 6), however, as the waves were released simultaneously in October 2007, distributors later grouped them together and released the following set as Wave 6.

Wave 6
 Hulk (Ripped shirt, green) and Spider-Woman
 Cable and Captain America (shield on back)
 Doctor Octopus (classic costume) and Black-Suited Spider-Man (webslinging arms extended to sides)
 Deadpool and Punisher (Captain America costume)

Wave 7
 Daredevil (red/right arm behind head) and Spider-Man (webslinging arms to front)
 Wolverine (yellow costume/arms to body) and Psylocke
 Venom (without tongue) and Spider-Man (right arm to ground)
 Ghost Rider and Flame Cycle

Wave 8
 Carnage and Ben Reilly
 Hobgoblin and Spider-Man
 Ares and Thor (New Costume)
 Hand Ninja and Wolverine (Samurai costume)

Wave 9
 Spider-Man and Sentry
 Spider-Man and Electro
 Blade and Punisher
 Captain America and Red Skull

Wave 10
 Spider-Man and Ultron
 Spider-Man and Ronin
 Weapon X and Mystique
 Skrull Soldier and Nick Fury
 Skrull Soldier and S.H.I.E.L.D. Agent

 Two different Wave 10 Two-Packs containing the "Skrull Soldier" were solicited to retailers at different times as containing either "Nick Fury" or "Blonde S.H.I.E.L.D. Agent". Both variations of this pack were produced and are now available at retailers; it is unclear at this time whether both are equally available or if either is a chase figure.

Wave 11
 Spider-Man and Shang-Chi
 Classic Cyclops and Marvel Girl
 Thing and Kang the Conqueror
 Insulated Spider-Man and Shocker

Wave 12
 Captain America and Black Widow
 Spider-Armor Spider-Man and Rhino (classic)
 Spider-Man and Tombstone
 Astonishing Beast and Avalanche

Wave 13
 Iron Man (Thorbuster Armor) and Thor (New Costume)
 Scarlet Spider and Bullseye
 Silver Surfer (poseable) and Human Torch (standing, transparent)
 Tigra and Spider-Man (arms extended with under-arm webbing)

Wave 14
 Wolverine (Jim Lee uniform) and Bishop
 Spider-Man and Green Goblin
 Spider-Man (black) and Iron Fist
 Iron Man 2020 and Deathlok

Wave 15
 Wolverine (Astonishing X-Men uniform) and Silver Samurai
 Hulk and Nova
 Spider-Man and Vulture
 Iron Man and Spider-Woman

Wave 16
 Iron Man (Extremis Armor with removable helmet) and War Machine
 Moon Knight and Spider-Man (Wave 13)

Wave 17
 Captain America and Motorcycle
 Iron Man (Neo-Classic Armor) and M.O.D.O.K.
 Wolverine (Astonishing X-Men uniform, version 2) and Spiral

Wave 18
 Abomination (comic version) and Thor (version 3)
 Scarlet Witch and Spider-Man (with web shield)
 Reptile Doomer and Doctor Doom (holding Infinity Sword)

Wave 19
 Hulk (crouching) and Falcon (with Redwing)
 Iron Man (cartoon) and Doctor Strange (flying)
 Thanos and Captain Marvel

Wave 20
 Deadpool (holding two guns) and Taskmaster
 Wolverine (Astonishing, shiny dark blue) and Juggernaut (Punching)
 Spider-Man (crouching, with web backpack) and Ronan the Accuser

Wave 21
 Iron Man and Tiger Shark
 Hercules and Thor (new costume)
 Spider-Man (with web shield) and Arachne
 Iron Man and Red Hulk
 Black Costume Spider-Man & the Green Goblin

Wave 22
 Spider-Man and Thor
 War Machine and Iron Patriot
 Wolverine and Polaris

Wave 23
 Dark Surfer and Captain America
 Iron Man and Invisible Woman with Marvel's H.E.R.B.I.E.

Single Packs
 Spider-Man
 Ben Reilly
 Iron Man
 Hulk
 Wolverine
 Silver Surfer

Easter Egg Packs
 Spider-Man (jumping)
 Spider-Man (crouching)
 Captain America
 Hulk

Spider-Man Super Hero Squad Two-Packs

Wave 1
(Movie costumes)
 Spider-Man (jumping) and Green Goblin (glider)
 Spider-Man (unmasked) and New Goblin (glider)
 Spider-Man (black costume wallcrawling) and Sandman (phasing)
 Spider-Man (with symbiote) and Venom (version 1, navy red tongue)

 Also they released as single packed figures.

Wave 2
(Movie/Ultimate Costumes)

 Spider-Man (webslinging, two hands) and Doc Ock (olive coat)
 Spider-Man (lunging/dark blue) and Ultimate Rhino

 Also released as a single packed figure.

Wave 3
(Movie costumes/Movie video game costumes)

 New Goblin (no glider) and Green Goblin (no glider)
 Spider-Man (webslinging, right hand only) and Lizard
 Spider-Man (punching) and Scorpion

Wave 4
(Movie costumes, but Black Cat, Mysterio, and Puma are in comic book style)

 Spider-Man (webslinging, left hand only) and Black Cat
 Spider-Man (standing, two fists) and Mysterio
 Venom (version 1, black/pink tongue) and Puma

Wave 5
(Movie/movie video game adaption costumes)

 Venom (version 2) and Sandman (standing)
 Spider-Man (black costume, jumping) and Kraven
 Spider-Man (wallcrawling) and Vulture

Spider-Man Single Packs
 Spider-Man
 Venom
 Doc Ock
 New Goblin
 Sandman
 Green Goblin
 NOTE: The single figures are released only in the UK.

Hulk Super Hero Squad Two-Packs

Wave 1
 Hulk (World War Hulk costume) and Iron Man (World War Hulkbuster iron man Armor)
 Hulkbuster Soldier and Hulk (Movie costume)
 Silver Savage and Hulk (Planet Hulk costume)
 Abomination and Hulk

Wave 2
 Thing (hands together) and She-Hulk
 Gray Hulk and Wolverine (version 1/shiney)
 King Hulk and Black Bolt
 Hulk (smashing) and Absorbing Man

Wave 3
 Gray Hulk and The Leader
 Hulk and Zzzax
 Hulk and Doc Samson
 Hulk and Son Of Hulk (Skaar)

Vehicles

Spider-Man Super Hero Squad Vehicles
 Spider-Man (standing/open left hand) and Battle Truck
 Spider-Man (standing/open right hand) and Spider Racer

Marvel Super Hero Squad Cruisers
 Arachno Roadster with Spider-Man (webslinging, right hand only) and Thing (shorts)
 Off-Road Avenger with Wolverine and Captain America
 Hero Helicopter with Captain America and Thor
 Repulsor Racer with Iron Man and Cyclops
 Claw Cruiser with Wolverine (Wave 7)
 Spider Splasher with Spider-Man
 Web Wheels with Spider-Man
 Repulsor Rammer with Ultimate Iron Man

Marvel Super Hero Squad Battle Vehicles
 Hover Car with Iron Man and Ultimate Nick Fury
 Quinjet with Spider-Man and Iron Fist

Marvel Super Hero Squad Mega Vehicle Playset
 Mobile Command Center with Logan and motorcycle
 Super Hero Headquarters with Iron Man

Playsets

Spider-Man Super Hero Squad Playsets
 Bank Heist Battleground - Spider-Man (standing, open right hand) and Doctor Octopus (forest green coat, no shirt)

 The Bank Heist Battleground was released in two versions, one with a silver car and one with a blue and red car.

Web slinging spiderman and green goblin pack with spiderman house and green goblin bank.

Hulk Super Hero Squad Playsets
 Gamma Lab Adventure - Spider-Man and Hulk

 The Gamma Lab Adventure is a re-release of the Bank Heist Battleground playset, with Hulk replacing Doctor Octopus.

Marvel Super Hero Squad 3D Pop-Up Playsets
 Avengers:Super City with Spider-Man and Iron Man
 X-Men:Danger Room with Wolverine and Sabretooth
 Battle for Doom's Castle with Doctor Doom (version 2) and Iron Man
 Crusaders of the Cosmos with Silver Surfer and Iron Man
Note 1: The 3D Pop-Up Playsets are interconnectible.

Marvel Super Hero Squad Mega-Packs

Wave 1
 Wolverine (unmasked) and Sentinel
 Human Torch (transparent body) and Galactus

Wave 2
 Beast (fuzzy) and Apocalypse
 Ultimate Iron Man and Ultimate Giant Man

Wave 3
 Iron Man (Classic Armor) and Fin Fang Foom
 Cyclops (Astonishing X-Men costume, crouching) and Sentinel (Pink)

Wave 4
 Ultimate Wolverine and Ultimate Hulk
 Mister Fantastic and Galactus (metallic repaint of the first mega pack Galactus)
 NOTE: Wave 4 was cancelled.
 NOTE: Wave 5 was planned but was only rumored and it was cancelled.

Boxed Sets

Marvel Super Hero Squad Five-Packs
 X-Men's Danger Room Debacle! (Toys 'R Us Exclusive) - Angel (blue costume), Cyclops (black costume), Wolverine (yellow costume), Colossus (shiny), and Magneto (gold base)
 Avengers Face-Off! - Hulk, Iron Man (gold and red armor), Captain America, Wasp, and Thor (black armor) (Toys 'R Us Exclusive)

Spider-Man Super Hero Squad Five-Packs
 Spider-Man 3 Movie Box Set: "Sand Pit Stand-Off (Toys r us exclusive)" - Spider-Man (Jumping), Venom (version 1, navy/red tongue), Sandman (phasing), New Goblin (glider), Spider-Man (Chrome, wallcrawling)

Marvel Super Hero Squad Four-Packs
 Battle for New York - Spider-Man (Right hand open), Elektra (White costume), Punisher (Green Bazooka), Ghost Rider (Transparent Flames)
 X-Men Showdown with Magneto - Wolverine (Brown/Fastball Special pose), Colossus (Fastball Special pose), Emma Frost, Magneto (Arms out)
 Avengers Assemble - Captain America (Shield on back, shiny), Spider-Man (Iron Spider costume), Vision, Ms. Marvel
 X-Men Unite - Logan (Black shirt), Juggernaut (Battle damaged), Nightcrawler (Teleporting), Gambit (Transparent card and staff)
 Winter Soldier Saga - Captain America, Winter Soldier, Falcon, and Crossbones
 Spider-Man Saves the Day - Spider-Man (Hanging from spotlight), Mary Jane Watson, Green Goblin and Sandman
 The New Fantastic Four - Storm (Black and White), Black Panther (All Black), Human Torch, Thing
 The Defenders - Hulk (Green), Silver Surfer, Nighthawk, Gargoyle
 The Secret Invasion Begins - Skrull Soldier, Iron Man, Mister Fantastic, Doctor Strange (Astral Form)
 Super Hero Secret Wars - Hawkeye, Captain America, Spider-Man, Wrecker

Marvel Super Hero Squad Seven-Packs
 Defeat of Dr. Doom - Iron Man, Spider-Man, Hulk, Doctor Doom, Falcon, Reptil, Volcana
 Avengers Attack - Crossbones, Iron Man, The Leader, Wolverine, Captain America, Red She-Hulk, Spider-Man (Black Costume)

Iron Man Super Hero Squad Four-Packs
 Iron Man Hall of Armor - Tony Stark, Iron Man (Silver Centurion Armor), Iron Man (Hulkbuster Armor), Iron Man (1st Appearance sliver Armor)
 Iron Man Face Off - Iron Man (Classic Armor, flying), War Machine (standing), Titanium Man, Crimson Dynamo
 Crimson Dynamo Attacks - Iron Man (Desert Armor), Iron Man (Classic Armor), War Machine (Red and yellow armor/standing), Crimson Dynamo
 The Genius of Tony Stark - Spider-Man (Iron Spider costume), War Machine (Ultimate), Iron Man (1st Appearance, Gold armor), Iron Man (World War Hulk Hulkbuster armor, with dark gray)
 Iron Monger Attacks - 1st Appearance Iron Man (movie), Iron Monger, War Machine, Iron Man (movie)
 The Danger Of Dreadknight - Dreadknight, Zhang Tong (Mandarin), Stealth Armor Iron Man, Iron Man (Neo-Classic Armor)

Wolverine Super Hero Squad Four-Packs
 The Hunt for Mr. Sinister - Cable, Wolverine (X-Force costume), X-23, Mister Sinister
 Battling the Brotherhood - Blob, Wolverine (unmasked), Bobby Drake (transparent), Colossus (version 1, metallic)
 The Coming of Apocalypse - Wolverine (version 2, brown/tan), Apocalypse, Archangel, Nightcrawler
 The Uncanny X-Men - Deadpool, Sabretooth (brown), Wolverine (brown/tan, Fastball Special pose), White Phoenix of the Crown
 Wolverine on the Run - Deadpool (film), Logan with motorcycle (film), Victor Creed
 Doom of the Dark Beast - Logan with motorcycle, Dark Beast, Havok
 Wolverine Evolution - Wolverine (with Bone Claws), Wolverine (Congo Assault Outfit), Wolverine (Weapon X Escape), Wolverine (X-Men Movie Uniform)
 X-Cutioner's Song - Marvel Girl, Cyclops (Wave 1), Wolverine (Wave 7), Stryfe

Iron Man 2 Super Hero Squad Three-Packs
 Armor Evolutions - Iron Man Mark I, Iron Man Mark II, Iron Man Mark III (version 2)
 Armor Wars: Part I - War Machine (Stanetech Armor), Iron Man (Neo-Classic Armor), Iron Monger (comic version)
 Armor Wars: Part II - Crimson Dynamo (version 2), Iron Man (1960s Red & Gold Armor), Titanium Man
 Final Battle - Iron Man Mark V, Marine Drone, Ivan "Whiplash" Vanko
 Hi-Tech Showdown - Iron Man Mark VI, War Machine (film version), Hammer Drone
 Armor Vault - Iron Man (leaning backward), Iron Man (red and black Hulkbuster Armor), Iron Man (in Torpedo Armor)
 Iron Defense Squad - Rescue, Iron Man (Hulkbuster Armor MK II), Captain America (Wave 9)

Thor Super Hero Squad Three-Packs
 Asgardian Smash - Thor (new costume), Hulk (jumping), Odin
 Battle for Asgard’s Vault - Thor, Loki, Destroyer
 Battle in the Frozen Land - Thor, Sif, Frost Giant

Captain America Super Hero Squad Three-Packs
 Battle at the Red Skull's Lair - Captain America, Red Skull, Bucky Barnes
 Raid on Enemy Headquarters - Captain America with Motorcycle, HYDRA Soldier

Iron Man Super Hero Squad Three Packs
 War Mechs - War Machine, Iron Man, Detroit Steel

Marvel's The Avengers Super Hero Squad Three Packs
 Secret Invasion - Iron-Man Mark VI, Nick Fury, The Skrull
 Earth's Mightiest Heroes - Captain America, Thor (Avengers 2012 film), Black Widow
 Attack of Loki - Hulk (khaki pants), Hawkeye (Purple & Black), Loki (Metallic)

The Amazing Spider-Man Super Hero Squad Three Packs
 Battle Against Venom - Spider-Man, Venom (Metallic), Anti-Venom
 Super Villain Surprise! - Spider-Man, Green Goblin (Wave 14 and silver glider variant), Doc Ock (Green & Silver)
 Escape From Lizard's Lair - Spider-Man (2012 film), Gwen Stacy, The Lizard (2012 film)

Iron Man 3 Super Hero Squad Three Packs
 Battle Vault - Iron Man Mark III, Iron Man Mark I, Iron Monger (2008 film with blue color variant)
 Expo Air Assault - Iron Man Mark V, War Machine, Hammer Drone

Iron Man 3 Super Hero Squad Six Packs 
 Armored Mission Pack - Iron Man Mark 42, Rapid Deploy Iron Man, Iron Man (Deep Depth Armor), Ghost Armor Iron Man, Iron Patriot, Mandarin (Green color variant)

 Armored Mission Pack was a Target Exclusive

SDCC Exclusives
SDCC Exclusive 3-Pack - Iron Man (cartoon), Doctor Doom (in robe from the Superhero Squad Game on the pause menu), Mayor of Superhero City

Hulk Super Hero Squad Box Set
 Hulk Movie Box Set: "The Brawl That Shook The World" - Hulk (brown pants), Abomination, Hulkbuster Soldiers (2x), and Hulkbuster vehicle.

 "The Brawl That Shook The World" was a Toys R Us Exclusive

Collector's Packs
 Pack 1 - Daredevil (yellow costume), U.S. Agent, Dark Phoenix, War Machine, Johnny Storm (version 1), Thing (pants/white boots), Hulk (green/blue pants), Spider-Man (Lunging/light blue)
 Pack 2 - Professor X, Cyclops (Astonishing X-Men Uniform), Wolverine (Brown Uniform), Iceman (Original Form), Shadowcat (with Lockheed), Juggernaut (X-Men Uniform), Silver Surfer (Chrome), Spider-Man (Squatting/Movie Costume)
 Pack 3 - Mister Fantastic (Blue & White Uniform/Stretched Body), Spider-Man (Wave 7), Iron Man (Classic Armor/Flying), Emma Frost (Diamond Form), Ultimate Hulk, Falcon
 Pack 4 - Thor (Wave 18), Iron Man (Wave 19), Enchantress, Loki, Frost Giant, Hulk

Note 1: All of the Collector's Packs are Toys R Us exclusives.

Note 2: Collector's Pack 3 is the first of the Collector's Packs to feature a figure in scale to the large figures featured in the Mega-Pack line.

References

External links
 Hasbro's Super Hero Squad site
 Marvel's Super Hero Squad website
 Cartoon Network's Super Hero Squad Show site
 Marvel's Super Hero Squad show website
 Marvel's Super Hero Squad comic strip website

Marvel Comics action figure lines
Super Hero Squad toys